Maricaulis is a genus of the Maricaulaceae.

References

Further reading

Scientific journals

External links

Caulobacterales
Bacteria genera